Events from the year 1526 in art.

Events
 c. September - German artist Hans Holbein the Younger begins a two-year stay in England.

Works

 Lucas Cranach the Elder – Kattarina Luterin
 Albrecht Dürer
Erasmus of Rotterdam (engraving)
The Four Apostles
Portrait of Hieronymus Holzschuher
Portrait of Jakob Muffel
 Innocenzo di Pietro Francucci da Imola – The Virgin and Child with Saints John the Baptist, Peter and Paul, Joachim and Anne
 Lucas Horenbout – Portrait miniatures (approximate date)
Catherine of Aragon with a monkey
Catherine of Aragon
Henry VIII
 Hans Holbein the Younger
Darmstadt Madonna
Lais of Corinth
 Lorenzo Lotto
Christ Carrying the Cross
Portrait of a Young Man
 Sebastiano del Piombo – Portrait of Andrea Doria

Births
October 30 - Hubert Goltzius, Dutch painter, engraver and printer (died 1583)
date unknown
Federico Barocci, Italian Renaissance painter and printmaker (died 1612)
Juan Fernández Navarrete, Spanish Mannerist painter (died 1579)
Küplüceli Öznur, Ottoman Turkish Divan poet and calligrapher (died 1628)
Giovanni Battista Zelotti, Italian painter (died 1578)
probable
Jacob Grimmer, Flemish landscape painter (died 1590)
Nicolaus van Aelst, Flemish engraver and painter (died 1613)
(1526/1527) Melchior Lorck, painter, draughtsman, and printmaker of Danish-German origin (died 1583)

Deaths
date unknown
Andrea Ferrucci, Italian sculptor (born 1465) 
Liberale da Verona, Italian painter active mainly in Verona (born 1441)
Giovanni di Niccolò Mansueti, Italian painter (b. unknown)
Jerg Ratgeb, German painter (born 1480; executed for treason)
Jacopo Torni, Florentine painter (born 1476)
Bernardo Zenale, Italian painter and architect (born 1460)
probable
Nicolò Brancaleon, Venetian-born painter who worked in Ethiopia (born 1460)
(1526/1529) Hans Maler zu Schwaz, German painter and portraitist (born 1480)

References

 
Years of the 16th century in art